Kempe Gowda  is a 2011 Kannada-language action film starring Sudeepa and Ragini Dwivedi in the lead roles. The film was directed by Sudeepa and produced by Shankar Gowda. It is a remake of the Tamil-language film Singam directed by Hari. Arjun Janya has composed the music. A namesake sequel titled Kempegowda 2 was released in 2019.

Plot

Kempe Gowda is a sub-inspector in the small hometown of Rona in the Gadag district of Karnataka, where he is adored. His bumbling colleague Pashupati is cheerful and always helps him with his work. His family business is provisional stores and Kempegowda wants to join it but he joined the police due to his father's wishes. He resolves most of the problems in his village with non-violence and mutual counselling. He uses force only when the situation demands it, thereby gaining much reputation and love from the villagers. Mahadev an industrialist based in Bengaluru and a friend of Kempegowda's father comes to the village along with his beautiful daughter Kavya. Eventually, Kempegowda and Kavya fall in love with each other.

Bengaluru-based Armugam, a big-time extortionist with shady mafia dealings who blackmails people by complaining to the Income Tax Department, is required to travel to Gadag to sign a conditional bail. He instead, sends one of his allies to do the formalities, much to the anger and rage of Kempegowda who demands that Armugam sign the bail in person. Humiliated, Armugam reaches Gadag but is unable to take any revenge on Kempegowda fearing the immense love and devotion of the entire village towards Kempegowda. Using his political contacts, he gets Kempegowda transferred to Bengaluru to teach him a lesson. Kempegowda, unaware of Armugam's hand behind his transfer, joins Magadi Road police station. His co-worker, Sub-Inspector Bose, hates Armugam for his crimes but is unable to take any action because of Armugam's political powers. The assistant commissioner, Kempegowda's senior, is on Armugam's payroll and takes care of concealing and eliminating the evidence of Armugam's crimes from the eyes of the law. The police commissioner also does not help Kempegowda as there is no evidence against Armugam and the assistant commissioner and in turn, warns him to stay away from Armugam's case.

Unable to take on Armugam in his stronghold, Kempegowda wants to return to his village but is stopped by Kavya who encourages him to fight against the evil and not run like a coward. Being mentally tortured by Armugam, Kempegowda arrests Armugam's brother Vaikunta in a fake case of illegally smuggling alcohol. He thwarts off the assistant commissioner in full view of the public when the assistant commissioner, bounded by his duties to Armugam, tries to protect the henchman. Meanwhile, Armugam kidnaps Kavya's younger sister Divya for ransom. Rescuing her, with unexpected help from the Home Minister Kempegowda successfully traces the origins of the kidnapping racket to Armugam. Kempegowda also gets promoted to Assistant Commissioner of the specially-formed Anti-kidnapping Task Force. Mahadev, who was hostile to Kempegowda following an altercation with Kempegowda's father back at Gadag, softens up and agrees to give him Kavya's hand in marriage.

The police officers, including the police commissioner, and the assistant commissioner, now on Kempegowda's side, decide to help Kempegowda fight Armugam. They manage to kill Armugam's brother in an encounter at a hospital and begins to target everyone and everything related to Armugam. In retribution Armugam starts targeting everyone close to Kempegowda including Kavya whom he shoots but is saved by Kempegowda and Bose who is hacked to death by Armugam's henchmen. Finally in a bid to escape the arrest warrant issued out to him, Armugam kidnaps the Tamil Nadu Home Minister's daughter. He falsely tells Kempegowda that he is going to Mangaluru with her when he is actually going to Nellore in Andhra Pradesh to put the police off the track. However Kempegowda manages to pursue them till Gudur near Nellore, where he rescues the home minister's daughter and kills Armugam in an encounter. In the end as the post credits roll, Kempegowda is seen with Kavya heading back to Mysuru, and as when Kempegowda is stopped briefly by the Home Minister who offers an undercover mission, to which Kempegowda willingly agrees.

Cast

 Sudeepa as Kempe Gowda
 Ragini Dwivedi as Kavya
 P. Ravi Shankar as Armugam
 Ashok Kheni as Home Minister
 Prashanth as Bose
 Girish Karnad as Mahadeva, Kavya's father
 Ashok as Kempe Gowda's father
 J. Karthik as Vaikunta, Armugam's brother
 Sharan as Pashupathi, constable
 Tara as Kavya's Mother
 Chitra Shenoy as Kempe Gowda's mother
 Bullet Prakash as Thirupati
 Chiranjeevi Sarja as Ram (cameo)
 Jai Jagadish as ACP Shankar
 Vaibhav Rao 
 M. N. Suresh as Armugam's lawyer
 Patre Nagaraj 
 Arasu Maharaj 
 Shiva manju 
 Manmohan Rai 
 Mohan Juneja 
 Ba. Ma. Harish 
 Killer Venkatesh
 Vinayak Joshi 
 Tharun Sudhir
 Tarun Chandra
 Rahul Inapur
 Kiran Rao 
 Avinash Narasimharaju
 Kishori Ballal Kavya's grandmother
 H. G. Dattatreya as Kavya's grandfather
 Ravi Varma
 Rajeev Gowda

Soundtrack

The soundtrack of Kempegowda was released by Anand Audio. The songs were composed by Arjun Janya with lyrics by V. Nagendra Prasad.

Track listing

Release
Kempe Gowda was released in 100+ theaters on 10 March 2011 across the state.

Reception

Critical response 

A critic from The Times of India scored the film at 4 out of 5 stars and says "Ragini does due justice to the role as the lively and exciting girl next door. Sharan as a cop excels in tickling your funny bone. Tara, Girish Karnad, Jai Jagadish and Ashok Kheny play their part to a T. Cinematography by Krishna of `Mungaru Male' fame is noteworthy. Equally good is music by Arjun Janya. Ravi Varma and Different Danny deserve special mention for their brilliant stunt works". A critic from The New Indian Express wrote "Ragini has done a neat job. She is very good in the song sequences. Sharan makes audience giggle for a while with his performance. The movie is worth watching and also proves to be a family entertainer with a number of scenes loaded with sentiment".

Response
Kempe Gowda earned in its first week.

Awards and nominations

59th Filmfare Awards South :-
Filmfare Award for Best Film - Kannada – Nominated
Filmfare Award for Best Actor - Kannada – Nominated – Sudeepa
Filmfare Award for Best Actress - Kannada – Nominated – Ragini Dwivedi
Filmfare Award for Best Supporting Actor - Kannada – Winner – P. Ravi Shankar

1st South Indian International Movie Awards :-
Best Actor (Male) – Kannada – Nominated – Sudeepa
Best Actor (Female) – Kannada – Nominated – Ragini Dwivedi
Best Actor in a Supporting Role – Kannada – Nominated – Tara
Best Actor in a Negative Role – Kannada – Nominated – P. Ravi Shankar
Best Playback Singer (Male) – Kannada – Nominated – Vijay Prakash for the song "Thara Thara Hidiside"
Best Lyricist – Kannada – Nominated – Ghose Dheer for the song "Thara Thara Hidiside"

Sandalwood Star Awards :-
Best Film – Nominated
Best Actress – Nominated – Ragini Dwivedi
Best Actor in a Negative Role – Nominated – P. Ravi Shankar
Rising Star (Female) – Winner – Ragini Dwivedi
Best Music Director – Nominated – Arjun Janya
Best Stunt Director – Nominated – Ravi Varma
Best Stunt Director – Nominated – Different Dyani
Best Cinematographer – Nominated – Krishna
Best Editor – Nominated – N.M Vishwa

4th Suvarna Film Awards :-
Best Editor – Winner – N.M. Vishwa

Bengaluru Times Film Awards :-
Best Actor in a Negative Role – Winner – P. Ravi Shankar
Best Film – Nominated
Best Music Director – Nominated – Arjun Janya
Best Lyricist – Nominated – Yogaraj Bhat for the song "Hale Radio"
Best Playback Singer Male – Nominated – Sudeepa for the song "Hale Radio"
Best Playback Singer Female – Nominated – Shamitha Malnad for the song "Hale Radio"

1st Kannada International Music Awards (KiMA):-
Best Composer (Film Album) – Nominated – Arjun Janya
Best Background Score – Winner – Arjun Janya

References

External links
 
 

Films set in Bangalore
2011 films
2010s Kannada-language films
Fictional portrayals of the Karnataka Police
Kannada remakes of Tamil films
Films scored by Arjun Janya
Singam (film series)
2011 masala films
Films shot in Bangalore